Sara Smile is the third studio album by American country music singer Jimmy Wayne. It was released on November 23, 2009, by Valory Music Group, an imprint of Big Machine Records. The album's title track is a cover of Hall & Oates' 1976 single, as well as the first single from it. Dann Huff, Mark Bright and Nathan Chapman produced the album.

Content
Wayne co-wrote four of the album's tracks: "Just Knowing You Love Me," "Just Look at You," "I'll Never Leave You" and "Elephant Ears." The title track and lead-off single is a rendition of Hall & Oates' 1976 single, featuring backing vocals from the duo. Also included is the song "Things I Believe," which fellow country singer Keith Urban wrote with John Shanks, as well as "Belongs to You," previously released as a single by Canadian country band Emerson Drive on its 2009 album Believe. Additionally, "I'll Never Leave You" was a non-charting single released by Wayne to country radio in 2007, but was not included on a previous album.

Critical reception
Thom Jurek of Allmusic gave it four stars out of five. His review described the "Sara Smile" cover favorably and said, "Three full-lengths in, Wayne is transcending his singles artist status and becoming an album-oriented one because of the musical consistency and hardcore emotional intensity of his singing and writing." Jessica Phillips of Country Weekly magazine also cited this cover as a standout track and commended it for containing "romantic ballads" that "[give] his voice room to soar." Her review gave it three-and-a-half stars out of five.

Dan McIntosh of Roughstock gave a mostly negative review, saying that the Hall & Oates cover "certainly smells like a deceptive ploy to attract middle-aged female music fans." He also criticized the themes of most songs by saying, "One also gathers that Wayne is convinced women today are looking for transparent men of their word." McIntosh's review also criticized the album for a lack of up-tempo material.

Track listing

Personnel

 Nick Buda – drums
 Tom Bukovac – electric guitar
 Nathan Chapman – acoustic guitar
 Jake Clayton – fiddle
 Eric Darken – percussion
 Dan Dugmore – electric guitar
 Paul Franklin – steel guitar
 Daryl Hall – vocals on "Sara Smile"
 Wes Hightower – background vocals
 Mark Hill – bass guitar
 Whitney Duncan – vocals on "Just Knowing You Love Me"
 Dann Huff – electric guitar, mandolin
 Mike Johnson – steel guitar
 Charlie Judge – keyboards, drum loops, percussion, strings
 Andy Leftwich – fiddle
 Chris McHugh – drums
 Tim Marks – bass guitar
 Jimmy Nichols – keyboards
 John Oates – vocals on "Sara Smile"
 Scotty Sanders – steel guitar
 John Shanks – electric guitar
 Jimmie Lee Sloas – bass guitar
 Ilya Toshinsky – acoustic guitar
 Jimmy Wayne – acoustic guitar, lead vocals, background vocals
 Lonnie Wilson – drums
 Jonathan Yudkin – upright bass, cello, fiddle, mandolin, viola, violin

Chart performance
Album

Singles

References

2009 albums
Big Machine Records albums
Jimmy Wayne albums